Dual specificity testis-specific protein kinase 2 is an enzyme that in humans is encoded by the TESK2 gene.

Function 

This gene product is a serine/threonine protein kinase that contains an N-terminal protein kinase domain that is structurally similar to the kinase domains of testis-specific protein kinase-1 and the LIM motif-containing protein kinases (LIMKs). Its overall structure is most related to the former, indicating that it belongs to the TESK subgroup of the LIMK/TESK family of protein kinases. This gene is predominantly expressed in testis and prostate. The developmental expression pattern of the rat gene in testis suggests an important role for this gene in meiotic stages and/or early stages of spermiogenesis.

References

Further reading